Church of the Virgin was a Serbian Orthodox Church located in the village of Naklo, in the municipality of Peć, in Kosovo. It was built in 1985 and it belonged to the Diocese of Raška and Prizren of the Serbian Orthodox Church. After the arrival of the Italian KFOR troops in 1999, the church was demolished and burned by the Albanians.

References

External links 
 The list of destroyed and desecrated churches in Kosovo and Metohija June-October 1999 (Списак уништених и оскрнављених цркава на Косову и Метохији јун-октобар 1999)

Serbian Orthodox church buildings in Kosovo
Destroyed churches in Kosovo
Former Serbian Orthodox churches
20th-century Serbian Orthodox church buildings
Christian organizations established in 1985
Peja
Persecution of Serbs
Cultural heritage of Kosovo
1985 establishments in Yugoslavia